Independence: A Novel is a novel written by author Chitra Banerjee Divakaruni, and published on 30 November 2022 by HarperCollins. It tells the story of India’s independence through the eyes of three sisters, each of whom is uniquely different, with her own desires and flaws.

Critical reception 
Nandita Bose of The New Indian Express wrote "In this book, the author weaves her own tapestry so exquisitely that just one reading opens up in technicolour the broad sweep of Partition." Mini Kapoor of The Hindu wrote "If this is another echo of Little Women, Divakaruni introduces enough twists to make the narrative chords of the storyline her very own." Shuma Raha of Deccan Chronicle wrote "However, the sisters’ tale, though assiduously studded with seismic political events, remains, at heart, a prim domestic novel." Sonali Mujumdar of  Hindustan Times says "Independence, her new novel is a simmering cauldron bringing to a boil, questions of sisterhood, nationhood, love, betrayal, sacrifice and ambition."

References

External links 
 

Novels by Chitra Banerjee Divakaruni
Novels set in India
HarperCollins books